Nicholas Barry Menzies Clack (born 17 August 1930) is a British rower.

Rowing career
Clack competed at the 1952 Summer Olympics in Helsinki with the men's coxless four where they came fourth. He represented England and won a silver medal in the coxless pairs with Tom Christie at the 1954 British Empire and Commonwealth Games in Vancouver, Canada.

References

1930 births
Living people
British male rowers
Olympic rowers of Great Britain
Rowers at the 1952 Summer Olympics
People from Witney
Commonwealth Games medallists in rowing
Commonwealth Games silver medallists for England
Rowers at the 1954 British Empire and Commonwealth Games
European Rowing Championships medalists
Medallists at the 1954 British Empire and Commonwealth Games